Kedi may refer to:

 Kedi (2006 film), a Tamil movie directed by Jyothi Krishna and starring Ravi Krishna
 Kedi (2010 film), a Telugu movie directed by Kiran Kumar and starring Nagarjuna Akkineni
 Kedi (2016 film), a Turkish documentary directed by Ceyda Torun, about street cats in Istanbul
 Kedi Billa Killadi Ranga, a 2013 Tamil film
 Kenneth Kedi (born 1971), Marshallese politician
 KEDI (FM), a radio station licensed to Bethel, Alaska